Aenir is the third book in Garth Nix's The Seventh Tower series, published in 2001 by Scholastic. The cover design and art are by Madalina Stefan and Steve Rawlings respectively. This book was released recently in the UK.

Main characters 

Tal: A Chosen teenager brought up in the Chosen castle on the Mountain of Light to use Sunstones and summon Spiritshadows. These Spiritshadows come from the dream world of Aenir and are trapped by the Chosen on their ascension day, where they become true chosen. These creatures absorb the chosen's shadow and therefore become their new shadows when they return to the land where the chosen live, the dark world. Thus named because of the magic veil placed above the land to block light from the sun, and so lessening the powers of rebel spiritshadows who are untrapped and therefore free to wreak havoc. Tal's family is scattered and each member is in peril, remembering the final words his father told him he sets out to Aenir so he can find the chosen Codex (which can answer all questions) so that he can track down his kidnapped brother.

Milla: A teenage Icecarl brought up on the icy wastelands surrounding the chosen castle. She has been brought up believing that the spiritshadows are evil creatures. She longs to be a shield maiden, a female warrior sworn to protect her clan. Her clan lives on an ice ship, a ship on skates pulled across the ice. They live by hunting the most common animal on the ice, massive Selski that move around the herd in massive herds destroying everything in their way. They make their weapons using the horns of narwhal-like creatures called Merwins. The Sunstone used to light up her ship is dying, and so she is sent by her elders to assist Tal (who fell from the chosen castle and came upon their ice ship) in his quest, as well as finding a powerful sunstone for their ship. After entering the castle she decides to aid Tal in finding the Codex.

Thus we find Tal and Milla in the spirit world of Aenir, where rivers and trees move daily, and even the most solid mountains can lift themselves off the earth.

Plot 

After arriving in Aenir they offer up blood on the hill they are standing on. This summons up two storm shepherds, Aenirian creatures with a heart of thunder and cloud, who then demand a life in exchange for a great gift. Soon the two characters discover that the two shepherds do not like taking lives, but only do it because they were bound thousands of years ago to do that exact task ever more. When they do not take a life and hesitate when Tal offers to make them his and Milla's spiritshadows to release their bind on the hill, the spirit in the hill awakes to sort out the problem. Afraid, the two creatures accept Tal's offer and quickly grab their new chosen and escape the hill, exhilarated to finally be free. Tal's spirit shadow is Adras, a big but dim witted male. While Milla ends up with Odris, a more sharp witted slender female. Neither is very good at reading human emotions and find themselves confused quite often.

When Milla realizes that Tal's offer has removed her true shadow, she flies into a rage. Tal gets angry at her because he does not fully understand that when he gave away her true shadow, he destroyed her hopes of being a shield maiden, as they are sworn to destroy all Spiritshadows, and cannot possibly have one themselves. Going berserk, Milla first threatens him with her Merwin horn sword before putting it away and knocking him out. She then storms off by herself. Adras and Odris then have a small talk about the over reactions of humans before deciding that Odris should probably go with Milla to make sure she doesn't get hurt. Adras then turns into a thunder cloud and surrounds Tal, protecting him while he is asleep.

Milla ends up at the edge of a burnt field, she calms down and starts to head back to Tal when she realizes there is something underneath her, a quick glance shows that she is on the only patch of green grass in the area. She then jumps just in time as the creature, called a Hugthing, snaps shut, clasping her legs together. With her hands free she hacks at the Hugthing with her sword, but it just bounces off. Just as her ribs are about to break Odris appears in the sky and hurls lightning bolts at the creature. it lets go and runs away making scared noises. She and Milla walk together through the trees when they run into a pack of giant hunting birds, the pack of birds then chase the pair until they reach a giant tower carved from a gigantic tree, where Odris lands on top. Milla takes the stairs to the bottom floor and can't explain why the door is wide open but the birds, called Nanuchs remain content to remain outside and wait for them to come out.

Meanwhile, Tal is waking up and soon finds a pack of bugs making a sign in the ground with their bodies, an arrow pointing east and the letter c. This is because the Codex, trapped under a mountain years before, is trying to direct Tal towards its prison by taking over animal-level intelligence creatures.

2001 novels
Children's fantasy novels
Novels by Garth Nix
2001 fantasy novels
2001 children's books
Australian children's novels
Scholastic Corporation books